Westergate is a short river of Bremen and Lower Saxony, Germany. It is a branch of the Weser.

The Westergate branches from the Weser west of Farge. It reunites with the Weser near Elsfleth.

See also
List of rivers of Bremen
List of rivers of Lower Saxony

References

Rivers of Bremen (state)
Rivers of Lower Saxony
Rivers of Germany